Thallophaga is a genus of moths in the family Geometridae described by George Duryea Hulst in 1896.

Species
Thallophaga taylorata (Hulst, 1896)
Thallophaga hyperborea (Hulst, 1900)
Thallophaga nigroseriata (Packard, 1874)

References

Lithinini